Michael Brandner (born 22 November 1951) is a German actor. He appeared in more than one hundred films since 1988. He is co-founder and 1st chairman of the Deutsche Akademie für Fernsehen based in Munich and Cologne.

Selected filmography

References

External links 

1951 births
Living people
German male film actors
Recipients of the Cross of the Order of Merit of the Federal Republic of Germany